Astha Agarwal is an Indian television actress, known for her role of Prathna in Kya Hal, Mister Panchal. She also did cameos in Sapne Suhane Ladakpan Ke as Vidhi, Ek Tha Raja Ek Thi Rani. as Jhumki, Kavach...Kaali Shaktiyon Se as Minty.  She's also the pageant winner of Gladrags Mrs India 2014. In recent times, she portrayed negative protagonist in Shubharambh serial on Colors.

Television 
 2022 - Choti Sarrdaarni as Kiara Kaur Randhawa
 2020 - Imlie as Nidhi
 2019 - Shubharambh  as Jharna
 2019 - Laal Ishq as Mohi
 2017 - Khwaabon Ki Zamin Par as Arya's co-actor, an established movie star
 2017 - Kya Hal Mister Panchal  as Prathana Kanahiya Panchal
 2017 - Khatmal E Ishque as Biba
 2017 - Savdhaan India as Bindiya
 2016 - Khidki as Anjali for "9 saal ki dadi maa" story
 2016 - Bharatvarsh as Sanyogita
 2016 - Kavach...Kaali Shaktiyon Se as Minty
 2016 - Darr Sabko Lagta Hai as B
 2015 - Ek Tha Raja Ek Thi Rani as Jhumki
 2015 - Krishan Kanhaiya as Sonu
 2015 - Peterson Hill as Meena
 2014 - Beintehaa as Rida Khan
 2014 - Sapne Suhane Ladakpan Ke as Vidhi
 2014 - Ek Hasina Thi as Aashka

See also 
 List of Hindi television actresses
 List of Indian television actresses

References

External links
 

Actresses from Mumbai
Living people
Year of birth missing (living people)
Actresses in Hindi television
21st-century Indian actresses
Actresses from Delhi
Indian television actresses